Joseph D. Stewart, also known as "Joey D,"  (July 9, 1942 – April 30, 2019) was a United States Marine Corps major general, who after his retirement from the Marine Corps, was appointed as superintendent of the United States Merchant Marine Academy (USMMA) on August 1, 1998.  He retired from the U.S. Maritime Service with the rank of vice admiral on September 30, 2008.

Education
Born in Baltimore, Maryland, Stewart graduated from the Severn School in 1960 and the United States Naval Academy in 1964.  Vice Admiral Stewart earned a master's degree in Operational Research from the U.S. Naval Postgraduate School, and a master's degree in Management from Salve Regina College and the Naval War College, Newport, Rhode Island.

Stewart played lacrosse while at the Naval Academy, playing on three straight national championship teams.

Marine Corps career
Upon his graduation from the Naval Academy, Stewart entered the Marine Corps as a second lieutenant. During his thirty-four-year Marine Corps career, he served in a variety of command and staff positions. He commanded a tank company, a supply battalion, and a defense distribution depot. He has also served as an instructor and athletic coach at the Naval Academy.  As a major general, he served as commander, Marine Corps Logistics Base Albany in Georgia. Stewart served as deputy chief of staff for installations and logistics at the U.S. Marine Corps Headquarters in Washington, D.C.

He retired from the Marine Corps at the rank of major general in 1998 and soon after assumed the duties as the academy superintendent.

Superintendent of the US Merchant Marine Academy

The academy, operated by the United States Department of Transportation's Maritime Administration, is located at Kings Point, New York. It is one of the nation's prime sources of licensed merchant marine officers and is renowned for its maritime education and training programs. Vice Admiral Stewart retired from the United States Merchant Marine Academy on September 30, 2008. He died from melanoma in 2019 at the age of 76.

Military awards
Vice Admiral Stewart's personal decorations include:

Dates of rank

Marine Corps
 Second Lieutenant: June 1964
 First Lieutenant: December 1965
 Captain: March 1967
 Major: January 1974
 Lieutenant Colonel: October 1980
 Colonel: January 1986
 Brigadier General: June 1991 &‐ July 11, 1996
 Major General: August 1993

Maritime Service
 Rear Admiral: August 1, 1998
 Vice Admiral: 2003

References

‐

1942 births
2019 deaths
Recipients of the Navy Distinguished Service Medal
Recipients of the Legion of Merit
United States Marine Corps generals
United States Merchant Marine Academy alumni
United States Merchant Marine Academy superintendents
United States Naval Academy alumni
United States Marine Corps personnel of the Vietnam War
Recipients of the Defense Superior Service Medal
Recipients of the Humanitarian Service Medal